The 1945–46 Rochester Royals season was the franchise's first season in the National Basketball League.

Season standings

Eastern Division

Western Division

Statistics

Regular season

Playoffs

Awards and records
 NBL Rookie of the Year: Red Holzman
 All-NBL First Team: George Glamack, Red Holzman
 All-NBL Second Team: Al Cervi

Transactions

References

External links
 Sacramento Kings History Timeline | Sacramento Kings

Sacramento Kings seasons
Rochester
National Basketball League (United States) championship seasons
Rochester Royals
Rochester Royals